Claudio Castilla Ruiz (born 30 May 1983) is a Spanish Olympic dressage rider. He competed at the 2016 Summer Olympics in Rio de Janeiro, where he finished 38th in the individual and 7th in the team competition.

Castilla Ruiz also competed at the 2010 World Equestrian Games and at four editions of European Dressage Championships (in 2009, 2011, 2017 and 2019). His best result came at the 2011 Europeans, when he placed 5th in the team dressage competition.

Dressage results

Olympic Games

World Championships

European Championships

World Cup

Western European League

Q - denotes qualification for the World Cup Final

Western European League podiums
2 podiums (0 gold, 2 silver, 0 bronze)

References

External links
 

Living people
1983 births
Spanish male equestrians
Spanish dressage riders
Equestrians at the 2016 Summer Olympics
Olympic equestrians of Spain